Wild In London is the third live album by The Tubes released in 2005. It was recorded on December 6, 2004 at Londons' Shepherd's Bush Empire and features some newer Fee Waybill characters such as "Russell Chaps". The CD featured a guest appearance by Beki Bondage who dueted with Fee Waybill on "Don't Touch Me There"

There was an accompanying DVD called The Tubes Wild West Show, which has many more tracks than the CD release.

Track listing
"Overture" – 2:32
"She's A Beauty"  – 5:47
"Don't Touch Me There"  – 5:29
"Malaguena Salarosa"  – 4:17
"Russell Chaps Intro" – 1:33
"Tip Of My Tongue"  – 5:37
"Don't Want to Wait Anymore"  – 7:05
"TV Is King"  – 3:10
"No Way Out"  – 3:51
"Let There Be Drums"  – 3:50
"White Punks on Dope"  – 8:37
"Mondo Bondage"  – 5:46
"Haloes"  – 5:30
"Talk to Ya Later"  – 10:06

Personnel
Musicians
 Fee Waybill – vocals
 Gary Cambra – guitar, keyboards, vocals
 David Medd – keyboards, vocals
 Roger Steen – guitar, vocals
 Prairie Prince – drums
 Rick Anderson – bass guitar
 Beki Bondage – vocals

Production
 Roger Lomas – engineer, mixing, producer
 Richard Evatt – assistant engineer
 Tim Jones – liner notes

References

The Tubes albums
2005 live albums